Cavalry Scout is a 1951 American Western film directed by Lesley Selander and starring Rod Cameron, Audrey Long and Jim Davis.

Cast
 Rod Cameron as Kirby Frye 
 Audrey Long as Claire Conville 
 Jim Davis as Lieutenant Spauldiing 
 James Millican as Martin Gavin 
 James Arness as Barth 
 John Doucette as Varney 
 William 'Bill' Phillips as Sergeant Hal Wilkins 
 Stephan Chase as Colonel Drumm 
 Rory Mallinson as Corporal 
 Eddy Waller as General William Sherman 
 Frank Wilcox as Matson 
 Cliff Clark as Colonel George Deering

References

Bibliography
 Terry, Rowan. The American Western A Complete Film Guide. 2013.

External links
 

1951 films
1951 Western (genre) films
1950s English-language films
American Western (genre) films
Cinecolor films
Films directed by Lesley Selander
Films produced by Walter Mirisch
Monogram Pictures films
Western (genre) cavalry films
1950s American films